A. Geoffrey "Geoff" Lee AM OAM (1928–2007) served as the International Commissioner of Scouts Australia, as well as the Vice-Chairman of the Asia-Pacific Scout Committee and then Vice Chairman of the Lord Baden-Powell Society Management Committee, and played a major role in the success of the 16th World Scout Jamboree.

In 2001, Lee was awarded the 289th Bronze Wolf, the only distinction of the World Organization of the Scout Movement, awarded by the World Scout Committee for exceptional services to world Scouting, as well as the Silver Kangaroo, the highest national award of Scouts Australia.

Lee was a well-known Sea Scout and Royal Sydney Yacht Squadron member since 1964, active yachtsman and yachting benefactor, as well as an adept fundraiser. He was Governor of the Sydney Heritage Fleet and Board Member of the Heart Research Institute. He served as chairman and a life member of the Australia Day Regatta, the world's oldest continuously conducted sailing regatta. He was also a member of the Cruising Yacht Club of Australia, and a past flag officer of the Royal Prince Alfred Yacht Club. He donated many perpetual trophies to sailing, including one for line honours in the Australia Day ocean race to Botany Bay and return.

His memorial service was held at Saint Mark's Church, Darling Point on 4 December 2007.

References

External links

complete list

http://www.parliament.nsw.gov.au/prod/PARLMENT/hansArt.nsf/V3Key/LA19991020033 report to Parliament on World Scout Foundation in Sydney in 1999

Recipients of the Bronze Wolf Award
Scouting and Guiding in Australia
1928 births
2007 deaths